was a Japanese diplomat and businessman of the Meiji period, and the first Japanese Consul General to New York.

The son of a samurai from Shōnai Domain, Takagi entered naval training school in 1859, and after that studied abroad in the United States. Following his studies, he remained in the United States, and served as diplomatic secretary beginning in 1871. He resigned from the Ministry of Foreign Affairs, however, in 1880, and became director of a silk company in Yokohama. His company was famous for its efforts to improve sericulture methods and techniques of the spinning industry.

References
Takagi Saburō at Portraits of Contemporary Japanese (Japanese) (近代日本人の肖像)

1841 births
1909 deaths
Japanese diplomats
Japanese businesspeople
Consuls General of Japan in New York